The Promise in Compromise is the third studio album by the American band Tokyo Rose.

Track listing

 "Less Than Four" – 2:25
 "The Promise In Compromise" – 3:02
 "We Can Be Best Friends Tonight, But Tomorrow I'll Be..." – 3:36
 "A Pound Of Silver Is Worth Its Weight In Blood" – 3:15
 "Right As Rain" – 2:49
 "611 Life Lesson" – 3:10
 "Can I Change Your Mind?" – 3:18
 "Swimming With The Sharks" – 3:47
 "Call It What You Like, Just Leave Us Out Of It" – 3:02
 "I Won't Say It" – 3:06
 "Seconds Before The Crash" – 4:13

2007 albums
Tokyo Rose (band) albums